Princess Eleonore Caroline Gasparine Louise Reuss-Köstritz (22 August 1860 – 12 September 1917) was Tsaritsa (Queen) of Bulgaria, the second wife of Ferdinand I of Bulgaria and by birth member of an ancient House of Reuss.

Life

Born in Castle Trebschen, in the Prussian Province of Brandenburg (present-day Poland), the daughter of Prince Heinrich IV Reuss zu Köstritz (1821-1894) and Princess Luise Caroline Reuss zu Greiz (1822-1875), widowed Princess of Saxe-Altenburg. She was also a younger sister to Prince Heinrich XXIV Reuss of Köstritz and a first cousin to Grand Duchess Maria Pavlovna of Russia. Eleonore's father Heinrich IV and Marie's mother Auguste were brother and sister. She was described as "a plain but practical... capable and kind-hearted woman."

Following the death of his first wife, Marie Louise of Bourbon-Parma, Tsar Ferdinand sought another wife to carry out the official duties required of the consort of a head of state. As a man who was no longer required to produce heirs, Ferdinand stipulated to his assistant that he wanted a bride who did not expect affection or attention. 

A list of candidates was whittled down to Eleonore and she and Ferdinand subsequently married at a Catholic ceremony on 28 February 1908 at St. Augustine's Church in Coburg and a Protestant ceremony on 1 March 1908 at Osterstein Castle, Reuss family estate. Initially titled Princess of Bulgaria, Eleonore assumed the title Tsaritsa ("Empress") on 5 October 1908 following Bulgaria's declaration of independence from the Ottoman Empire.

Eleonore remained neglected by Ferdinand throughout their marriage, leaving her to raise her stepchildren and devote herself to the welfare of the Bulgarian people. Eleonore came into her own during the Balkans and First World Wars when, working tirelessly as a nurse, she was a cause of great comfort for many injured and dying Bulgarian soldiers. It was said that she had "a special gift for relieving suffering".

Tsaritsa Eleonore became seriously ill during the final years of World War I, dying in Euxinograd, Bulgaria on 12 September 1917. Her last wish was to be buried in the cemetery of a 12th-century church at Boyana, near Sofia. During the Socialist period, however, the grave was broken into, her jewelry stolen and then the memorial stone bulldozed back in the grave, with no visible marks left over the ground. However, after the democratic changes in 1989, the original memorial stone was excavated and the site was restored back to the original state.

Arms

Ancestry

References

 Aronson, T. (1986)  Crowns in conflict: the triumph and the tragedy of European monarchy, 1910–1918, J. Murray, London.  
 Constant, S. (1979)  Foxy Ferdinand, 1861–1948, Tsar of Bulgaria, Sidgwick and Jackson, London.

External links
 

|-

|-

1860 births
1917 deaths
Reuss
Reuss
Bulgarian consorts
House of Saxe-Coburg and Gotha (Bulgaria)
Princesses of Reuss